Sergeant Kirk or Sgt. Kirk is the main character of the Western comics series of the same title by Italian comic book creator Hugo Pratt and Argentine author Héctor Germán Oesterheld.

Publication history
The series, originally created in Argentina during the Golden Age of Argentine Comics, was first published in issue 225 of the weekly comics magazine Misterix on January 9, 1953. Sargento Kirk continued its run in Misterix until issue 475 on December 20, 1957, when Oesterheld's own publishing house Editorial Frontera was established, and the series resumed in the Frontera magazines Frontera Extra and Hora Cero Suplemento Semanal. It ran until 1961 with drawings by Pratt, Jorge Moliterni, Horacio Porreca and Gisela Dexter. An additional Sargento Kirk story was published in 1973 in the magazine Billiken, drawn by Gustavo Trigo.

Synopsis
Sergeant Kirk is a former soldier of the American Civil War who goes on to serve in the post-war Wild West. Forced to participate in a massacre of American Indians by the U.S. Army, Kirk deserts and devotes himself to defending the Indians. An essentially noble man, Kirk treats even his enemies with tolerance and humanitarianism. Among Kirk's companions appearing in the series are "El Corto", Dr. Forbes and the Native American boy, Maha.

Magazine
Sergeant Kirk was chosen as the name of the magazine Pratt launched in Italy in July 1967, aided financially by the patron Florenzo Ivaldi. This carried showcased work from the Argentine period, as well as the series Luck Star O'Hara, Gli Scorpioni del Deserto, and the first publication of Corto Maltese in the story Una Ballata del Mare Salato. The magazine maintained regular distribution until December 1969, and was issued sporadically during the 1970s.

Notes

Sources

 Sgt. Kirk publications, Misterix publications Archivespratt
 Sgt. Kirk magazine dossier FFF

External links
 Sergent Kirk French album publications Bedetheque 

Sergent Kirk
Sergent Kirk
Italian comics characters
Sergent Kirk
Western (genre) comics characters
Fictional sergeants
Fictional American Civil War veterans
Comics by Héctor Germán Oesterheld
Comics set during the American Civil War
Magazine mascots
1953 comics debuts
1961 comics endings
1973 comics debuts
1973 comics endings
Comics by Hugo Pratt
Male characters in comics
Male characters in advertising
Mascots introduced in 1953
Western (genre) heroes and heroines